Cape Timblón is the conspicuous rocky cape forming the north extremity of Snow Island in the South Shetland Islands, Antarctica. It is a northwest entrance point for Morton Strait. Linus Beach extends for 2 km on the east side of the cape. The area was visited by 19th century sealers.

The feature is named after Captain Carlos Timblón, Master of the Argentine sealing ship San Juán Nepomuceno that visited the South Shetlands in 1819–20.

Location

Map
 L.L. Ivanov. Antarctica: Livingston Island and Greenwich, Robert, Snow and Smith Islands. Scale 1:120000 topographic map.  Troyan: Manfred Wörner Foundation, 2009.

References
 SCAR Composite Antarctic Gazetteer.

Timblon